Allygus mixtus is a species of true bug belonging to the family Cicadellidae.

Synonyms:
 Cicada mixtus Fabricius, 1794 (= basionym)
 Jassus corisipennis Ferrari, 1882
 Allygus alticola Horvath, 1903

References

Cicadellidae